Galain-Chazh ("gorge of Galay") is a historical region in the North Caucasus. Today, Galain-Chazh is a part of Galanchozhsky District, Chechnya.

Since the Middle Ages, Galain-Chazh has been known as the historical center and birthplace of the Galay teip, a clan of the Orstkhoy tukkhum. In 1944, the entire population was deported to Kazakhstan. Since then, there has been no permanent population in the region.

Name 
The name Galain-Chazh roughly translates to English as "gorge of Galai". The name originated from the Galai clan, who settled in the gorge.

Geography 
Galain-Chazh is located in the center of Galanchozhsky District. The territory includes Galain-Am (Lake Galanchozh), which is also named after the Galai clan.

Galain-Chazh borders with Orstkhoy-Mokhk in the north, Akka in the west, Nashkha in the east, and Terloy-Mokhk in the south.

Auls 
Galain-Chazh includes the following villages:
 Aka-Bass,
 Ame,
 Amka,
 Chusha,
 Ei-Salashka,
 Iga-Yurt,
 Kerbeta,
 Kerbicha,
 Korga,
 Ochakh,
 Terkhie.

References 

History of Chechnya